Gastélum is a surname. Notable people with the surname include:

Alejandra León Gastélum (born 1976), Mexican politician
Bernardo J. Gastélum (1886–1981), Mexican physician, politician and writer
Diva Hadamira Gastélum (born 1961), Mexican politician
Jorge Gastélum (born 1988), Mexican footballer
Juan Manuel Gastélum (born 1954), Mexican politician
Kelvin Gastelum (born 1991), American mixed martial artist

Surnames
Spanish-language surnames
Surnames of Mexican origin